Xuan Jinglin (1907 – January 22, 1992), also romanised as Sie King-ling, was a Republican era Chinese actress. She was bought out of a brothel and became a successful actress.

Life
Xuan was born in Shanghai in 1907 when her name was Tian Jinlin. She was brought up in a family that was so poor that her mother sold her to a brothel in order that her elder siblings might eat. She had little education and was described as barely literate.

She was discovered by Zhang Shichuan. He had seen her as a child in an amusement park where he was the manager. He later re-found her and offered her a small part in a now lost film. He liked her acting and bought her out of the brothel so that she could act in films by the Mingxing Film Company. This was then a small company that he was a director of, and from May 1925 she had parts in Mingxing films as both her, and the company's, fortunes improved.

Her stage name was devised by Zheng Zhengqiu who based it on the name she had adopted in the brothel and a transliteration of Lillian Gish into Shanghainese.

Her second film, A Woman in Shanghai, was devised for her and echoed her own Cinderella story. She played a prostitute who is rescued by a millionaire. She was not typecast, and she played a female gangster, an innocent country girl, a dancer and a poor widow in 1920s Mingxing films.

In 1930 Mingxing Films invested its profits from the epic (27 hour) martial arts films The Burning of the Red Lotus Temple in a new studio. This new technology is featured in their 1930/1931 film "An Amorous History of the Silver Screen" which features Xuan. The film has been described as "self-referential docudrama" as it tells the story of a prostitute who becomes an actress. The film is also seen as showing a new relationship with technology as the early romance is superseded by the technology. Xuan plays again a prostitute in a film with the film and she strikes back at her attacker. This act within the film is seen, by Zhang Zhen, as emblematic of a change in the film's story and the actress's life.

In 1931 she made her first film outside Mingxing films. She appeared in Tianyi Film Company's film "Pleasures of the Dance Hall" which was very popular. The backstage plot featured sound from a disc and was a musical with drama interspersed with songs.

Invasion
On 18 September 1931 the Japanese engineered the Mukden Incident as a pretext to launch an invasion of Manchuria. The war stopped filming when they invaded Shanghai on January 28, 1932. Xuan formed the Xuan Jinglin Road Company and toured China giving musical performances.

Xuan died in Shanghai in 1992. Because of her important role in early Chinese cinema she has been included with Yang Naimei, Wang Hanlun and Zhang Zhiyun in  China's "Four Famous Actresses".

Films

The Last Conscience (1925)
Little Friend (1925)
A Pitiful Girl (1925)
He Wants a Baby (1926)
Nameless Hero (1926)
A Good Man (1926)
The Rich Man's Daughter (1926)
A Lovelorn Actress (1926)
Suspicious Couple (1926)
Real and False Daughters (1927)
Fallen Plum Blossoms (1927)
The Young Mistress's Fan (1928)
A Dissolute Woman (1930)
Virtuous Mother From a Brothel (1930)
Last Love (1931)
Shanghai Woman (1931)
Farewell to Yuren (1931)
A Couple in Life and Death (1931)
Pleasures of the Dance Hall (1931) 
Shadow on the Window (1931)
A Married Woman (1932)
Twin Sisters (1933 or 4)
Two Against One (1933)
The Future (1933)
Mother and Son (1933)
Homesick (1934)
A Brief Life (1934)
The Doctrine of Women (1934)
Sisters Reborn (1934)
A Big Family (1935)
Tears of Blood in the Dance Hall (1936)
Family (1956)
Beside the Sanba River (1958)
Fragrance in the Air (1959)
The Underground War (1959)
Family Problems (1964)

References

1907 births
1992 deaths
Actresses from Shanghai
20th-century Chinese actresses
Chinese film actresses
Chinese silent film actresses
Chinese prostitutes